Em Toda Parte (Portuguese for "All Around") is the second studio album by Brazilian psychedelic rock band Violeta de Outono, released on June 18, 1989 by Ariola Records. It was also their last release before they entered a hiatus period in 1993 that would last until 1995. Beginning with this album, Violeta de Outono abandons their post-punk influences and gradually shift towards a more progressive-influenced sonority.

"Terra Distante" would be re-recorded for their next studio album, Mulher na Montanha, while "Dança" would appear on Ilhas.

It was re-released in 2007 by Voiceprint Records, containing two bonus tracks.

Track listing

Personnel
 Fabio Golfetti – vocals, guitar
 Cláudio Souza – drums
 Angelo Pastorello – bass

References

External links
 Em Toda Parte at Violeta de Outono's official Bandcamp

1989 albums
Violeta de Outono albums
Portuguese-language albums